Mansour El Souwaim (Arabic: منصور الصويم, born 1970 in Nyala, Sudan) is a Sudanese writer and journalist. He has published both novels and short stories. He was invited to join the first IPAF Nadwa (Arab writers' workshop) as well as  the Beirut39 young Arab writers project, and has received international recognition through translations of his novels into English and French.

Biography 
El Souwaim was born in Nyala in southern Darfur, and lives and works in the Sudanese capital Khartoum. He started writing in 1990 and was first published in 1995. Up to 2021, he has released five novels and two collections of short stories. His first novel was called Tukhoum Ar-Ramad (Boundaries of Ash) and translated into English in 2012. His second novel, entitled Dhakirat Shirrir (Memoirs of a Villain), received the Tayeb Salih Award for Creative Writing, named after the famous Sudanese novelist, in 2005. It was published in French in 2021 and received a positive review in the literary section of Le Monde newspaper.

In 2009, El Souwaim was invited by the inaugural IPAF Nadwa (Arab writers' workshop). In 2010, he was one of the Beirut39, a group of 39 Arab writers under the age of 40, chosen through a contest organised by Banipal magazine and the Hay Festival. In 2011, El Souwaim received a grant by the Arab Fund for Arts and Culture (AFAC)  for his next project, a historical novel entitled The Last Sultan. In 2023, he was awarded his second Tayeb Salih International Award for Creative Writing for his novel Blue Algae.

Works in Arabic and in translation 

 Tukhoum Ar-Ramad (Boundaries of Ash), 1995, English translation 2012
 Dhakirat Shirrir (Memories of a Bad Boy), 2005  French translation: Souvenirs d'un enfant des rues. 2012. 
 Ashbāḥ Faransāwī (French ghosts), 2014
 Ākhir al-salāṭīn: ḥurūb al-sulṭān ʻAlī Dīnār ʻalá tukhūm madāfin al-salāṭīn,  (The Fall of the Sultans: Sultan Ali Dinar's Wars on the Borders of the Sultans' Tombs) 2016
 ʻArabat al-amwāt (The Chariot of the Dead), 2016
 Kānat, wa kān, wa kānat al ukhrā (She was, he was and the other one was), short stories, 2021

See also
 Sudanese literature
 List of Sudanese writers
 Modern Arabic literature

References

Further reading 
 Mansour El Souwaim on literature in Sudan, 2010, on arablit.org
 Mansour El Souwaim on new and inventive voices in Sudanese literature, 2022 on arablit.org
 Mansour El-Souwaim’s short story ‘The Gizzard Tree’ translated by Nassir al-Sayied al-Nour on arablit.org

Sudanese male writers
Sudanese novelists
Sudanese male short story writers
Sudanese short story writers
People from Darfur
1970 births
Living people
20th-century Sudanese writers
21st-century Sudanese writers
20th-century male writers